KDYM (1230 AM) is a radio station licensed to Sunnyside, Washington, United States. The station is owned by Centro Familiar, Cristiano of Seattle, WA.

References

External links

DYM